Manuel Costa may refer to:

 Manuel Costa (cyclist) (born 1921), Spanish cyclist
 Manuel Costa (footballer) (born 1989), Angolan footballer